is a Japanese manga series written and illustrated by Marimo Ragawa. It was serialized in Kodansha's shōnen manga magazine Monthly Shōnen Magazine from December 2009 to August 2022, and has been collected in twenty-nine tankōbon volumes. An anime television series adaptation produced by Shin-Ei Animation aired from April 3 to June 19, 2021, on the Animeism programming block.

Characters

Media

Manga
The manga is written and illustrated by Marimo Ragawa. The series was serialized in Kodansha's Monthly Shōnen Magazine from December 5, 2009, to August 5, 2022. Kodansha has compiled its chapters into individual tankōbon volumes. The first volume was published on October 15, 2010. As of December 16, 2021, twenty-nine volumes have been released. An omnibus edition with the first three volumes released in Japan on March 17, 2021.

Kodansha USA is publishing the manga digitally in North America.

Volume list

Anime
An anime television series adaptation was announced in the September issue of Monthly Shōnen Magazine on August 6, 2020. The series is animated by Shin-Ei Animation and directed by Hiroaki Akagi, with Kan'ichi Katō handling series composition, and Jiro Mashima designing the characters. The Yoshida Brothers will supervise the  music in the anime. The two opening theme songs "Blizzard" and "Ginsekai" (Silver World) was performed by Burnout Syndromes, while the ending theme song "Kono Yume ga Sameru Made" (Until I Wake From Dreaming) was performed by Miliyah Kato and the Yoshida Brothers. The series aired from April 3 to June 19, 2021, on the Animeism programming block on MBS, TBS, and BS-TBS. Crunchyroll licensed the series outside of Southeast Asia. Mighty Media has licensed the series in Southeast Asian territories.

Episode list

Reception
Those Snow White Notes was nominated for the 4th Manga Taishō, and it was ranked third in the 2012 Kono Manga ga Sugoi! Top 20 Manga for Male Readers survey. It also won the 36th Kodansha Manga Award in the shōnen category and an Excellence Award at the 16th Japan Media Arts Festival Awards. The series was nominated for the 23rd Tezuka Osamu Cultural Prize in 2019. Volume 9 has sold 70,223 copies as of October 20, 2013.

Notes

References

External links
 

2021 anime television series debuts
Anime series based on manga
Animeism
Coming-of-age anime and manga
Crunchyroll anime
Drama anime and manga
Kodansha manga
Music in anime and manga
Shin-Ei Animation
Shōnen manga
Winner of Kodansha Manga Award (Shōnen)